William de Romare (born c. 1096) (also Roumare or Romayre or Romay), Earl of Lincoln, 2nd Baron of Kendal, Lord of Bolingbroke.

He was the son of Roger FitzGerold (de Roumare), 1st Baron of Kendal, Lord of Bolingbroke and Lucy, widow of Ivo de Taillebois. He followed his father as Lord of Bolingbroke, Lincolnshire. He was half-brother to Ranulf of Chester.

In Normandy, he was Seigneur (Lord) of Roumare.

In 1120 William was supposed to have crossed the Channel with William the Aethling in the White Ship but fortunately disembarked shortly before it sailed, narrowly avoiding drowning in the subsequent sinking of the ship. 

He was created Earl of Lincoln by King Stephen after 1143. The Earl lived at both Bolingbroke and Lincoln Castle.
 
He was the ducal constable of the fortress of Neufmarche, stoutly resisting Hugh de Gournay, then in rebellion there, in 1118 in Normandy.

Family and children
He married Hawise de Reviers, sister of Baldwin de Redvers, 1st Earl of Devon (Reviers) and had one known child:
William (Helie) de Roumare, married Agnes de Aumale. They had a son William de Roumare who married twice and died without issue.

References

George Edward Cokayne, "The Complete Peerage of England, Scotland, Ireland, Great Britain, and the United Kingdom, Extant, Extinct, or Dormant", I-XIII (in 6) (Thrupp, Stroud, Gloucestershire, GL5 2BU: Sutton Publishing Limited, 2000), III:166, VII:667.

Roumare
1090s births
11th-century English people
12th-century English nobility
People from East Lindsey District
Peers created by King Stephen